Ryan Bailie (born 15 July 1990) is an Australian triathlete. He won a bronze medal at the 2014 Commonwealth Games in the mixed relay event.

Early life
Bailie was born in South Africa before moving to Bunbury, Western Australia, where he lived until age 18. His sister Ashlee is also a triathlete.

Career
Bailie has competed in the ITU World Triathlon Series since 2012, with several top ten finishes, including a best finish of 5th in Auckland in 2014.

Ryan was a part of the Australian team at the 2014 Commonwealth Games in Glasgow. In the individual event he finished fifth in hot conditions. In the mixed relay, Bailie ran the anchor leg for the Australian team. In the final sprint Bailie outran Canada's Andrew Yorke to win the bronze medal, finishing one second behind Richard Murray of South Africa.

He qualified for the Australian team for the 2016 Summer Olympics in April 2016.

References

External links
 Official website
 
 
 

1990 births
Living people
Triathletes at the 2014 Commonwealth Games
Australian male triathletes
Sportspeople from Johannesburg
Commonwealth Games bronze medallists for Australia
Triathletes at the 2016 Summer Olympics
Olympic triathletes of Australia
Commonwealth Games medallists in triathlon
20th-century Australian people
21st-century Australian people
South African emigrants to Australia
People from Bunbury, Western Australia
Sportsmen from Western Australia
Medallists at the 2014 Commonwealth Games